Angiomotin-like protein 1 is a protein that in humans is encoded by the AMOTL1 gene.

Function 

The protein encoded by this gene is a peripheral membrane protein that is a component of tight junctions or TJs. TJs form an apical junctional structure and act to control paracellular permeability and maintain cell polarity. This protein is related to angiomotin, an angiostatin binding protein that regulates endothelial cell migration and capillary formation.

References

External links

Further reading